Return stroke is the most luminous and noticeable part of the lightning discharge.

Return stroke may also refer to:
 Return stroke, a type of shot in tennis
 Return stroke in swimming
 Return stroke of a four-bar linkage
 Return stroke of a shaper
 Return stroke of a vacuum engine